Bajramovci is a village in the municipality of Centar Župa, North Macedonia. Bajramovci was once a former neighbourhood of the village of Balanci and in 1965 elevated to the status of an independent village. The population density of the village is 6.4 km2.

Name 
The toponym Bajramovci is a patronymic formation derived from the name Bajram and the suffix ovci.

Demographics
Bajramovci has traditionally been inhabited by a Muslim Macedonian (Torbeš) population.

As of the 2021 census, Bajramovci had 104 residents with the following ethnic composition:
Turks 81
Persons for whom data are taken from administrative sources 22
Albanians 1

According to the 2002 census, the village had a total of 117 inhabitants. Ethnic groups in the village include:
Turks 117

References

External links

Villages in Centar Župa Municipality
Macedonian Muslim villages